Dimitrie D. Pompeiu (– 8 October 1954) was a Romanian mathematician, professor at the University of Bucharest, titular member of the Romanian Academy, and President of the Chamber of Deputies.

Biography
He was born in 1873 in Broscăuți, Botoșani County, in a family of well-to-do peasants. After completing high school in nearby Dorohoi, he went to study at the Normal Teachers School in Bucharest, where he had Alexandru Odobescu as a teacher. After obtaining his diploma in 1893, he taught for five years at schools in Galați and Ploiești. In 1898 he went to France, where he studied mathematics at the University of Paris (the Sorbonne). He obtained his Ph.D. degree in mathematics in 1905, with thesis On the continuity of complex variable functions written under the direction of Henri Poincaré.

After returning to Romania, Pompeiu was named Professor of Mechanics at the University of Iași. In 1912, he assumed a chair at the University of Bucharest. In the early 1930s he was elected to the Chamber of Deputies as a member of Nicolae Iorga's Democratic Nationalist Party, and served as President of the Chamber of Deputies for a year. In 1934, Pompeiu was elected titular member of the Romanian Academy, while in 1943 he was elected to the Romanian Academy of Sciences. In 1945, he became the founding director of the Institute of Mathematics of the Romanian Academy.

He died in Bucharest in 1954. A boulevard in the Pipera neighborhood of the city is named after him, and so is a school in his hometown of Broscăuți.

Research

Pompeiu's contributions were mainly in the field of mathematical analysis, complex functions theory, and rational mechanics. In an article published in 1929, he posed a challenging conjecture in integral geometry, now widely known as the Pompeiu problem. Among his contributions to real analysis there is the construction, dated 1906, of non-constant, everywhere differentiable functions, with derivative vanishing on a dense set. Such derivatives are now called Pompeiu derivatives.

Selected works
.
.
.

See also
Cauchy–Pompeiu formula
Pompeiu–Hausdorff metric
Pompeiu's theorem
Pompeiu derivative
Wirtinger derivatives

Biographical references

References
. ("Areolar derivative and functions of bounded variation" is an important reference paper in the theory of areolar derivatives.)
.

1873 births
1954 deaths
People from Botoșani County
University of Paris alumni
20th-century Romanian mathematicians
Complex analysts
Mathematical analysts
Academic staff of Alexandru Ioan Cuza University
Academic staff of the University of Bucharest
Titular members of the Romanian Academy
Members of the Romanian Academy of Sciences
Democratic Nationalist Party (Romania) politicians
Presidents of the Chamber of Deputies (Romania)